Charles Clunas (13 February 1894 – 8 February 1916) was a Scottish professional footballer who played in the Scottish League for Clyde as a forward.

Personal life 
Clunas' younger brother William was also a footballer. Clunas was educated at Johnstone High School. In October 1914, two months after the outbreak of the First World War, he enlisted as a private in the 23rd (Service) Battalion of the Royal Fusiliers in the Central Hotel in Glasgow. Clunas was serving as an appointed lance corporal when he was killed by a rifle grenade at Givenchy-lès-la-Bassée, France on 8 February 1916. He was buried in Guards' Cemetery, Windy Corner, Cuinchy.

Career statistics

References 

Scottish footballers
1916 deaths
British Army personnel of World War I
British military personnel killed in World War I
1894 births
Royal Fusiliers soldiers
Clyde F.C. players
People from Johnstone
Scottish Football League players
Association football forwards
Association football inside forwards
Association football wing halves
Deaths by hand grenade
Burials at Windy Corner, Cuinchy
Military personnel from Renfrewshire